Soniia Cheah Su Ya (Chinese:谢抒芽, born 19 June 1993) is a former Malaysian badminton player. She is the younger sister of Lyddia Cheah who is also a professional badminton player.

Career
In her junior career, she represented Malaysia at the 2009, 2010, and 2011 Asian Junior Championships, World Junior Championships, 2010 Summer Youth Olympics, and 2011 Commonwealth Youth Games.

She won her first international title at the 2016 Belgian International tournament. At the Southeast Asian Games, she won the mixed team bronze medal in 2011, also the silver medals in 2017 in the women's singles and team event. Cheah competed at the 2018 Commonwealth Games.

She founded a badminton academy, Sunheart Badminton with her sister, Lyddia in April 2022. At 13 December 2022, she announced her retirement from badminton due to the pain from the relapse of her bone spur injury which she has been enduring since 2013.

Achievements

Southeast Asian Games 
Women's singles

Commonwealth Youth Games 
Girls' singles

Girls' doubles

Asian Junior Championships 
Girls' doubles

BWF Grand Prix 
The BWF Grand Prix has two levels, the BWF Grand Prix and Grand Prix Gold. It is a series of badminton tournaments sanctioned by the Badminton World Federation (BWF) since 2007.

Women's singles

  BWF Grand Prix Gold tournament
  BWF Grand Prix tournament

BWF International Challenge/Series 
Women's singles

  BWF International Challenge tournament
  BWF International Series tournament

References

External links 
 
 

1993 births
Living people
Sportspeople from Kuala Lumpur
Malaysian sportspeople of Chinese descent
Malaysian female badminton players
Badminton players at the 2010 Summer Youth Olympics
Badminton players at the 2018 Commonwealth Games
Commonwealth Games silver medallists for Malaysia
Commonwealth Games medallists in badminton
Competitors at the 2011 Southeast Asian Games
Competitors at the 2017 Southeast Asian Games
Competitors at the 2019 Southeast Asian Games
Southeast Asian Games silver medalists for Malaysia
Southeast Asian Games bronze medalists for Malaysia
Southeast Asian Games medalists in badminton
Badminton players at the 2020 Summer Olympics
Olympic badminton players of Malaysia
Medallists at the 2018 Commonwealth Games